Whitewater Falls may refer to a location in the United States:

 Whitewater Falls, Minnesota, an abandoned town
 Whitewater Falls (North Carolina), a series of cascades
Upper Whitewater Falls the upper section of it
Whitewater Falls a themepark ride at California's Great America#Haunt attractions